Benigno Ayala Felix (born February 7, 1951) is a former Major League Baseball player who had a 10-season career from  to . He played outfield, first base, and designated hitter. He played for the New York Mets and St. Louis Cardinals both of the National League and the Baltimore Orioles and Cleveland Indians both of the American League.

Career
Ayala made his major league debut as the Mets' starting left fielder at Shea Stadium on August 27, 1974. With one out and the bases empty, he hit a home run in his first at bat off the Houston Astros' Tom Griffin to open a three-run rally in the bottom of the second inning in a 4–2 Mets victory. After spending 1974 with New York, he spent 1975 in the minors, 1976 with the New York Mets. He was traded from the Mets to the St. Louis Cardinals for Doug Clarey during spring training on March 20, 1977.

He was acquired by the Baltimore Orioles from the Cardinals for Mike Dimmel on January 16, 1979 and assigned to the Rochester Red Wings. His contract was purchased by the Orioles from the Red Wings  months later on April 30. With Baltimore, Ayala routinely platooned with Gary Roenicke and John Lowenstein.

Ayala appeared in two World Series with Baltimore. In 1979, he belted a two-run homer in the Orioles' Game 3 win over the Pirates. In 1983, he made one pinch-hitting appearance against the Phillies. He singled home the tying run in Game 3 and later scored the winning run. The Orioles elected not to renew the option year on his contract on September 28, 1984.

See also
 List of Major League Baseball players from Puerto Rico
 Home run in first Major League at-bat

References

External links

 Wulf, Steve "It's The Right Idea For Left", Sports Illustrated, July 12, 1982

1951 births
Living people
Baltimore Orioles players
Cleveland Indians players
Columbus Clippers players
Maine Guides players
Major League Baseball designated hitters
Major League Baseball first basemen
Major League Baseball left fielders
Major League Baseball players from Puerto Rico
Major League Baseball right fielders
Memphis Blues players
New Orleans Pelicans (baseball) players
New York Mets players
People from Yauco, Puerto Rico
Pompano Beach Mets players
Rochester Red Wings players
Springfield Redbirds players
St. Louis Cardinals players
Tidewater Tides players
Visalia Mets players
West Palm Beach Tropics players